Caño Paujil is a waterfall in the Colombian department of Caquetá.

Description 
The waters of Caño Paujil originate from the Serranía de Chiribiquete. The fauna is Amazonian; jaguars, tapirs, anacondas, parrots and turtles. During the first half of the twentieth century, the area around Caño Paujil was important for the rubber production.

References

Bibliography 
 

Waterfalls of Colombia
Geography of Caquetá Department